Drabble is an internationally syndicated comic strip that appears in about 200 newspapers.  Kevin Fagan created the strip in 1979 and remains the sole writer and artist. The strip centers on the Drabble family, and is set in a fictionalized version of the greater Los Angeles area.

Publication history 
In the mid-1990s, the strip was nearly pulled from the Boston Herald. A grassroots effort, spearheaded by Robert S. Frisiello, Jr. convinced the paper to keep the strip running.

Characters 
Ralph: The father of the family, he worked initially as a pro-wrestler, and later as the original mall cop. Ralph has been working as a retirement village security guard and in August 2011 began a job as a TSA screener at Polecat International Airport. In 2021, he decided to be a park ranger at Polecat National Park. He constantly overeats and watches classic movies, and his hero is Ward Cleaver. One strip had him going to the doctors office to have his cholesterol checked, whereupon the doctor promptly called the Guinness Book of World Records. Has an alter ego as a pro wrestler. He is also famous for his "Glare," which strikes fear in just about anyone who looks him in the eye. He has a brother Fred.

June: The mother of the family and the most responsible one. Always called "Honeybunch" by Ralph. Not without her own faults, Ralph frequently complains about her spending habits and when he set up a Halloween house of horrors, he included something meant to scare just her-the house telephone off the hook. She's shown to be a sci-fi fan and in one strip attended a Star Trek convention in costume. She also likes to sing along with her iPod, which Ralph often mistakes for the cat yowling or the smoke alarm going off. She also has the habit of finishing Ralph's sentences, which greatly annoys him.  Honeybunch always wears her apron, even when they go out. In 2018, she is starting a photography business.

Norman: The sweet, but naive and dim-witted 19-year-old college student. He's the older son in the family. A bad case of arrested adolescence, he still sleeps on the top of a bunk bed with his younger brother Patrick and still asks his father to check the closet for monsters (though in one strip he managed to work up the courage to do it himself). In the fall of 2010, however, he moves into a dorm at college. He is also embarrassed about going to the beach because of his farmer's tan, and in one strip he looked like a farmer driving a tractor. He was also temporarily married to Wendy in Las Vegas, but that marriage was annulled because they were married by someone who was not an Elvis impersonator.

Patrick: The genius younger brother of Norman.  He was almost always dressed in a gi, but in early 2018, is almost always dressed in a hockey uniform and carrying around a hockey stick.

Penny: The youngest child of the family.

Wendy Fleetwood: Norman's college classmate. Norman has been trying to score a date with her since the beginning of the comic strip. She was also temporarily married to Norman in Las Vegas, but that marriage was annulled because they were married by someone who was not an Elvis impersonator. A running joke is that she often says "Norman, run!", which makes him flee and allows her to avoid a boring conversation. In the January 25, 2004 strip, it was revealed that her last name is Fleetwood.

No-Neck: A good friend of Ralph, who literally has no neck. He also works as a security guard and is slightly dumber than Ralph.

Neil: College student friend of Norman's.

Stu: Another college student friend of Norman's.

Leonard: Another college student friend of Norman's.

L. Floyd Gargle: a neighbor with a mutual loathing of Ralph.

Wally: The Drabbles' hyperactive dachshund. Wally was introduced in Christmas 1998 when Norman gave Ralph a dog because he couldn't afford something.

Bob: The Drabbles' duck. To protect him from the Neighborhood Homeowners Association, Norman lies and tells everyone that Bob is a rare South-American parrot who takes on the characteristics of a duck for survival.

Oogie: The Drabbles' cat, who Ralph does not like, but June adores.

George W. Steinbauer: The Drabbles' next door neighbor who does not like Ralph, and Ralph feels the same way. He and Ralph constantly argue and compete contentiously. Has a daughter named Opal and a son named Troy.

Brtny: A girl at Norman's college who seems to have a crush on him. She communicates through texting. Norman appears to like her as well.

Echo: A young woman about Norman's age whom he always bumps into when he wishes he could meet the perfect girl. After several false starts they finally get together. However, she has a pet badger, which contributes to ill-fated nature of their relationship, since badgers are Wally's mortal enemies.  Nicknamed "Echo" for her similarities to Norman, her real name is Norma.

Books
 The First Book of Drabble 1981
 Basic Drabble 1983
 Drabble ...in the Fast Lane 1985
 Dad, I'm an Elvis Impersonator 1991
 Son of Drabble 1997
 Mall Cops, Ducks and Fenderheads 1998
 Drabblations 1999
 Who Wants to be a Fenderhead? 2000

References

External links
 

1979 comics debuts
American comic strips
Fictional families
Comics about married people
Gag-a-day comics
Comics characters introduced in 1979